Garette Ratliff Henson (born January 5, 1980) is an American actor, best known for his role as Guy Germaine in The Mighty Ducks trilogy.

Early life and education 
Henson was born in Burbank, California to a professional photographer mother. He is the younger brother of Elden Henson. Henson also has a younger half-brother, Ellington Ratliff, who is a member of the band R5. Henson attended a private school in Burbank, where he was on the honor roll. He started in show business as a baby model and in 1987 auditioned for and got the role of Cory Charming in The Charmings (1987). Henson graduated from Sarah Lawrence College in 2002 and an MFA in film from Columbia University in 2015.

Career 
In 1992, 1994, and 1996, he starred in The Mighty Ducks trilogy alongside his older brother, Elden, and continued to play hockey in school. In 1995 he played the role of Christina Ricci's character's school crush Vic DePhillippi in the movie Casper.

Personal life 
Henson resides in New York with his wife Laurie, whom he married in 2007, and their son, who was born in 2014.

Filmography

Film

Television

References

External links 
 

1980 births
20th-century American male actors
21st-century American male actors
American male film actors
American male television actors
American male child actors
Columbia University School of the Arts alumni
Living people
Male actors from California
People from Burbank, California
Sarah Lawrence College alumni